Joakim "Kime" Vislavski (7 December 1940 – 10 September 2014) was a Yugoslav and Serbian football manager and player.

Playing career
Vislavski started playing at his hometown club Radnik Vrbas, aged 15. He later moved to Partizan, helping the side win the Yugoslav First League on four occasions (1960–61, 1961–62, 1962–63, and 1964–65). After leaving Partizan in 1967, Vislavski spent some time at Olimpija Ljubljana, before returning to his hometown and joining newly formed club Vrbas. He also represented Yugoslavia at the 1959 UEFA European Under-18 Championship.

Managerial career
During his managerial career, Vislavski worked at numerous clubs, including Vrbas, Mladost Apatin, Spartak Subotica, Inđija, AIK Bačka Topola, and Hajduk Kula. He died in his hometown at the age of 73.

Honours
Partizan
 Yugoslav First League: 1960–61, 1961–62, 1962–63, 1964–65

References

External links

 
 

Association football forwards
FK Hajduk Kula managers
FK Inđija managers
FK Mladost Apatin managers
FK Partizan players
FK Spartak Subotica managers
FK Vrbas managers
FK Vrbas players
NK Olimpija Ljubljana (1945–2005) players
People from Vrbas, Serbia
Serbian football managers
Serbian footballers
Yugoslav First League players
Yugoslav football managers
Yugoslav footballers
1940 births
2014 deaths